Oleksandr Ryabokon (born 21 February 1964) is a former Ukrainian football defender, and recently, until 2022, the head-coach of FC Desna Chernihiv in the Ukrainian Premier League. He is known for transforming a third tier team into a solid top-flight participant. He is also a combat veteran of the Russo-Ukrainian War.

Career

Footballer
A product of the Dynamo Kyiv football academy (specialized sports school of Olympic reserve), Ryabokon started his professional career in FC Desna Chernihiv in 1982. During the Soviet period he changed clubs every season playing mostly at the Soviet third tier. In late 1980s he managed to play for some Caucasus region clubs from Circassian Anapa and Armenian Vanadzor. Following dissolution of the Soviet Union, he soon gained squad stability playing for Sirius Zhovti Vody, a former Soviet third tier team, after which he finally signed up with a top-flight club from Belarus, FC Torpedo Mogilev. After a season in Belarus, Ryabokon returned to Ukraine where he continued to play at the third tier switching clubs every season.

Coach
After he retired from playing football, he was invited to work as an assistant coach in 1998. In 2000, Ryabokon became the head coach of the FC Borysfen Boryspil and two years later got the team promoted to the Ukrainian Premier League. At the end of June 2010, Ryabokon became the new head coach of FC Lviv in the Ukrainian First League.

Desna Chernihiv 
In 2012 he signed for Desna Chernihiv. he managed to promoted the team in Ukrainian First League after a great season 2012–13 of the Ukrainian Second League. In the season 2016–17 he has been elected Best Coach in the round 21, Round 23, Round 25, Round 29 and at the end of the season he has been elected even the best coach of the Ukrainian First League in the season 2016–17 and he next season with the club of Chernihiv won the Ukrainian First League in the season 2017–18.

In the season 2018–19 season he led the team to stay in Ukrainian Premier League without been relegated and he was elected Best Coach in Round 2, Round 6, Round 13 and Round 24.

In the 2019–20 season of the Ukrainian Premier League has been elected Best Coach in September 2019, in March 2020 and in June 2020.

He managed to bring the club at the 4th place in Ukrainian Premier League in the 2019–20 season and to qualify for the Europa League third qualifying round, for the first time in the history of the Club since 1960. Oleksandr Ryabokon won the Best Coach, 9 times in the 2019–20 season being the most winning coach in 32 rounds.

In the 2020-21 season of the Ukrainian Premier League was elected Best Coach of the round 1.

On 24 September 2020 Ryabokon was the coach that provided line up of the team of Desna Chernihiv against VfL Wolfsburg for the Europa League third qualifying round at the AOK Stadion.

On 9 March 2021 he has been elected Best Coach of the Round 17 of the Ukrainian Premier League in the 2020-21 season. On 12 April 2021 he was elected coach of the Round 21 in the season 2020-21 of Ukrainian Premier League

After the 2020-21 season, the club failed to qualify for the cups and Oleksandr Ryabokon with president of the club Volodymyr Levin let some players leave the club and adding new ones also with experience like Yevhen Selin who played in the Ukraine national football team. They worked also to rejuvenate the team, develop the academy in Chernihiv adding some players from Desna 3 Chernihiv and Desna 2 Chernihiv like Yevheniy Belych. In december 2021, the Desna Chernihiv's president Volodymyr Levin defined Ryabokon one of the best UPL of Ukrainian Premier League.

In 2022 due to the Russian full-scale invasion, Ryabokon soon after his birthday signed up for the Ukrainian Territorial Defense Forces in Chernihiv Oblast and participated in liberation of the region from the Russian occupational forces that were forced to flee.

Honours

Coach
 Ukrainian First League: 2017–18
 Ukrainian Second League: 2012–13
 Ukrainian First League: 2002–03
 Belarusian Premier League Runner-up: 2005
 Ukrainian First League Runner-up: 2002–03

Individual
 Ukrainian First League Best Coach: 2016–17

References

External links
 Profile on Official website of FC Desna Chernihiv
 
 

1964 births
Living people
Footballers from Kyiv
Soviet footballers
Ukrainian footballers
Ukrainian military personnel of the 2022 Russian invasion of Ukraine
Territorial Defense Forces of Ukraine personnel
Association football defenders
Ukrainian expatriate footballers
Expatriate footballers in Belarus
Expatriate footballers in China
Ukrainian expatriate sportspeople in China
FC Desna Chernihiv players
SKA Kiev players
FC Dnipro Cherkasy players
FC Zirka Kropyvnytskyi players
FC Vorskla Poltava players
FC Gomel players
FC Spartak-UGP Anapa players
FC Lori players
FC Kakhovka players
FC Sirius Kryvyi Rih players
FC Torpedo Mogilev players
FC Systema-Boreks Borodianka players
FC Slavutych players
Beijing Renhe F.C. players
NK Veres Rivne players
Ukrainian football managers
Ukrainian Premier League managers
Ukrainian expatriate football managers
Expatriate football managers in Belarus
FC Borysfen Boryspil managers
FC Obolon Kyiv managers
FC Dinamo Minsk managers
FC Dnipro Cherkasy managers
FC Desna Chernihiv managers
FC Lviv managers
FC Sevastopol managers